Stephen Jordan (born 5 August 1986) is an English science fiction, fantasy, horror and comedy writer, playwright and director.

Career

In 2009, he co-founded ManMoth Productions, a theatre production group, with Patrick Baker. In 2012, Jordan debuted his first solo production, a science fiction comedy play called 'Dead Static', about two strangers who have an hour to live in deep space. The production played to sold-out audiences and was well received. In 2013, Jordan debuted 'Pilgrim Shadow' at the Tristan Bates Theatre, sequel to Dead Static. A sequel to 'Pilgrim Shadow', called 'King Chaos', debuted in 2015, completing The Future Boys Trilogy.

In 2013, Jordan co-founded a new theatre production group, Bad Bat Productions, with Ellen Gallagher. Bad Bat's first theatre production was Jordan's 'The Probleming', a horror comedy that debuted as part of the 2014 Camden Fringe Festival. Jordan made his stage debut as a performer in Bad Bat's sketch show Global Mega Incorporated, which he also directed.

Jordan holds a BA in Creative & Media Writing, and an MA in Creative Writing within Science Fiction & Fantasy, both from Middlesex University. His humorous fantasy short story 'The Good Death Guide' won a 2014 Watty Award, presented by online writing community Wattpad. He has also contributed short stories to Paul Finch's Terror Tales series, appearing in an anthology that was nominated for a British Fantasy award in 2015.

In 2016, he co-produced Kim Newman and Sean Hogan's horror play 'The Ghost Train Doesn't Stop Here Anymore'. He also co-hosted the Film Wars podcast, an entertainment podcast about films, with Gareth Alexander. In 2017, he successfully crowd-funded via Kickstarter the live recording and digital distribution of an audio sitcom, 'The Future Boys', based on the eponymous heroes from The Future Boys Trilogy. In 2018, he wrote a Doctor Who story for Big Finish Productions.

Fiction 
Our Finest (short story for Kindle, 2022)
The Future Boys (novel, 2019)
Empire of Monsters (novella, 2018)
Aaaagh! Vienna (short story for Kindle, 2018)
Claws (Terror Tales of Cornwall, ed. Paul Finch, 2017)
Descent (short story for Kindle, 2016)
Caving In (The Good Death Guide & Other Tales, 2015)
A House for Nobody (w/ Ellen Gallagher. The Good Death Guide & Other Tales, 2015)
The Good Death Guide (The Good Death Guide & Other Tales, 2015. 'Watty Award' winner)
The Offspring (Terror Tales of Wales, ed. Paul Finch, 2014. British Fantasy Award nominee, Best Anthology)
Heat (KZINE, issue 8, ed. Graeme Hurry, 2014)
Sheep (KZINE, issue 4, ed. Graeme Hurry, 2012)

Audio 
Doctor Who - The Seventh Doctor New Adventures, Volume 1. Vanguard (Big Finish Productions. 2018)
The Future Boys. Murder Mystery (Sitcom, recorded at Leicester Square Theatre. 2017)
The Future Boys. The Museum (Sitcom, recorded at Leicester Square Theatre. 2017)
Dead Static (Audio version of stage play, 2013)

Theatre 
(As Writer/Director)
Super Global Mega Incorporated: Turbo (Sketch show w/ Adam Joselyn. Leicester Square Theatre, 2016)
King Chaos (Play. Tristan Bates Theatre, 2015)
Global Mega Incorporated (Sketch show w/ Ellen Gallagher, Adam Joselyn & Graeme Hurry. Etcetera Theatre, 2015)
Pilgrim Shadow (Play. Tristan Bates Theatre, 2013. The Dugdale Centre, 2014)
The Probleming (Play. Tristan Bates Theatre, 2014)
Dead Static (Play. Etcetera Theatre & Hen and Chickens Theatre, 2012)
A Hero's Journey (Play w/ Patrick Baker. Etcetera Theatre, 2011)

(As Director)
A Recipe For Disaster (Play by Ray Newell. The Dugdale Centre, 2014)

(As Producer)
The Ghost Train Doesn't Stop Here Anymore (w/ Ellen Gallagher. Play by Sean Hogan, Kim Newman, Stephen Gallagher, Rob Shearman, Lynda E. Rucker, Lisa Tuttle and Christopher Fowler. Tristan Bates Theatre, 2016)

Podcast 
Film Wars (w/ Gareth Alexander, film critic for The Sun newspaper. 2016–17)

References 

1986 births
Alumni of Middlesex University
English theatre directors
English dramatists and playwrights
Living people
English male dramatists and playwrights